Colin Connor (born 18 June 1954) is a Canadian–British dancer, choreographer, and educator, based in the United States. With over forty commissions that span the worlds of contemporary dance, ballet and flamenco. Works draws from a large range of influences – musical, literary, social, and scientific – all used to bring attention back to the communicative power of the human body. He frequently, collaborates with artists of other disciplines, including composers, artists, and designers. As a choreographer, teacher and dancer, Connor is currently influencing the next generation of contemporary dancers and dance makers. Dancers who have trained with Connor have gone on to Mark Morris Dance Group, Scapino Ballet, Hubbard Street Dance, The Limon Dance Company and others.

Biography
Connor was born in London, England. He received his first formal dance training in Canada. In addition to his role as choreographer, Connor performed as a dancer from the late 1970s through the 2000s. He danced for eight years as a soloist with the Limón Dance Company and also danced with the Mary Anthony Dance Theater. Additionally, he performed in his own work and was a guest with many other companies. Connor was also a core teacher initiating a new summer Limon workshop for Southern California and is a School of Dance faculty member at the California Institute of the Arts in Santa Clarita, California. Currently, he lives in the Los Angeles area.

Artistic philosophy
Connor describes his work as, "rooted in the mystery of how we live in our physical beings. It is an ongoing investigation of perception, both of dancers and audience, and based on how, in the end, all human experience is felt through the senses. With our lives increasingly mediated by various technologies, I believe that art which focuses attention back to the completeness of how we live in our bodies becomes ever more essential."

Performances have been described in the press as "earthy, a little rough and daring, sexy and totally spellbinding," (Dance Magazine) and his work has been called "a metaphor for human resilience," (The Village Voice). Additionally, his choreography drew this response from Jennifer Dunning of The New York Times: "a relief these days to see movement treated as a sufficiently expressive medium."

Teaching
As an educator, Connor has been on the faculties of New York University, where he also worked as a choreographer and movement teacher for the Theater Department's Classical Studio. He also worked at The Juilliard School and the City College of New York, the latter also as Choreographer in Residence. He has been a guest teacher at numerous dance training centers in the world including The Place in London, the Rotterdamse Dansacademie, Jacob's Pillow, Dresden's Palucca School of Dance, the Joffrey Summer Workshop, The Dance Studio in Novosibirsk, Russia, and the Rubin Academy in Jerusalem. He has been on the full-time faculty at the California Institute of the Arts (CalArts) since 2004.

Collaboration
According to his biography on the CalArts web site, Connor's "major collaborations include Solea and the Winds, a radical contemporary/flamenco evening which toured to critical acclaim for three years across Europe, Secondhand Sofa with bluegrass band The Biscuit Boys for the Piccolo Spoleto Festival, What The Waitress Saw, a deconstruction of a diner (with Emmy Award-winning theater designer, Charles Schoonmaker) for the Boston Conservatory's Copland Celebration with orchestra performing his clarinet concerto, and Near Ruins, a duet."

Commissions
Future productions are scheduled in 2010–2011 for Canadian Children's Dance Theatre (Toronto, Ontario, Canada), The Joyce Theater (New York), The Kennedy Center (Washington, D.C.), The Meeting House (Newport, Rhode Island), Richmond Ballet (Richmond, Virginia), and Island Moving Company (Newport, Rhode Island).

Works
Connor has choreographed over 40 works including:
 2010 Corvidae – Selected for the 2010 ACDFA gala performances at The Kennedy Center
 2009  ARENA – Commission for the Canadian Children's Dance Theatre
 2007  News Falls Like Rain – Solo for Debra Noble performed at Flight of Steps and on tour in Guatemala; Holdfast (The Fragile Warmth of Collisions in Freefall) – Commission for Island Moving Company and Simon Fraser University
 2005  Into the Air – Commission for Richmond Ballet; The Study of Man (collaboration with composer, Mark Trayle) – Performances at the REDCAT Theater and Cal Arts
 2004  The Rose Garden – Commission for Island Moving Company and University of California at Irvine
 2003  Secondhand Sofa – Winner of Charleston Ballet Theatre's Fountainhead Choreography Competition
 2002  Recent Arrivals – Commission for Island Moving Company
 2000  Vestiges – Commission for Richmond Ballet, Joyce Theater Performance (2010)
 1999  Solea and the Winds (Lovesongs) – In collaborative with Flamencos En Route, over one hundred performances across Europe
 1998  Full Sail (In Praise of Storms) – Winner of the Sarasota Ballet International Choreography Competition; Streets and Legends – Commission for Richmond Ballet, remounted on Atlanta Ballet Joyce Theater performances (1999)
 1997  Pyre – For Damaru Dance Company and Eisenhower Dance Ensemble (2009)
 1995  Near Ruins (duet for Colin Connor and Risa  Steinberg) – The Salvage Company
 1994  Flaws In The Glass – Commissioned by The Carlisle Project, remounted on Hartford Ballet & The Juilliard School

References

External links
 
Baker, Leona. "Preparing a Premiere: Dancers practice for the first performance of the season." Style Weekly. 21 September 2005.
 CalArts School of Dance bio for Colin Connor
Marshall, Lea. "Keeping It Fresh." https://web.archive.org/web/20100614085531/http://dancemagazine.com/issues/April-2010/New-York-Notebook  Dance Magazine. April 2010.
Menotti, Andrea "Heart to Coracao" http://www.villagevoice.com/2001-07-24/dance/heart-to-cora-ccedil-atilde-o/ The Village Voice. 24 July 2001.
Proctor, Roy. "Colin Connor's Dance is to be Part of Mixed-Repertory in May." Richmond Times – Dispatch. 25 February 1996.
"Richmond Ballet returns to the Joyce Theater 6–11 April 2010." https://web.archive.org/web/20100605022549/http://elitedance.com/blog/2010/02/19/richmond-ballet-returns-to-the-joyce-theater-april-6th-11th-2010/  Elitedance. 19 February 2010.

1954 births
Living people
Canadian contemporary dancers
Canadian choreographers
Dancers from Saxony